This is a list of fellows of the Royal Society elected in 1683.

Fellows 
William Gould  (1652–1686)
Allen Moulin  (1653–1690)
Charles Willughby  (d. 1694)
Edward Haynes  (1683–1708)
Arthur Bailey  (d. 1712)
Edward Wetenhall  (1636–1713)
Nathaniel Vincent  (d. 1722)

References

1683
1683 in science
1683 in England